Ekeshwar is a block in Pauri Garhwal district of Uttarakhand. Ekeshwar falls is in Chaubattakhal. There are 283 villages in Ekeshwar.

Climate 
The climate remains moderate even in summer, by monsoon the atmosphere becomes pleasant. By the winter, the region are bitter cold. Amid January—February, high hills receive heavy snowfall.

Education
 Govt. Degree College Chaubattakhal, was established in 1979 as a higher education centre in remote areas.

Religious shrines
Ekeshwar Mahadev

Ekeshwar Mahadev also known as "Igasar Mahadev" in local language. It is in Ekeshwar,  from Satpuli, surrounded by pines and Oak trees.

It is believed that the Pandavas did penance at this place of Lord Shiva, during Mahabharata period. Although it is believed that the temple was built by Adi Shankaracharya, but the construction style of the temple is modern.

The self-styled Shivalinga is enshrined in the sanctum sanctorum of the temple.

According to mythological reference Lord Shiva went Tarkeshwar Mahadev from Ekeshwar

References

External links
</ref>

Cities and towns in Pauri Garhwal district